The 1958 European Figure Skating Championships were held in Bratislava, Czechoslovakia. Elite senior-level figure skaters from European ISU member nations competed for the title of European Champion in the disciplines of men's singles, ladies' singles, pair skating, and ice dancing.

Results

Men

Ladies

Pairs

Ice dancing

References

External links
 results

European Figure Skating Championships, 1958
European Figure Skating Championships, 1958
European Figure Skating Championships
Figure skating in Czechoslovakia
International figure skating competitions hosted by Czechoslovakia
Sports competitions in Bratislava
European Figure Skating Championships, 1958
European Figure Skating Championships
European Figure Skating Championships